Mount Dall is a  mountain in the Alaska Range, in Denali National Park and Preserve, southwest of Denali. Mount Dall was named in 1902 by A.H. Brooks of the U.S. Geological Survey after naturalist and Alaska explorer William Healey Dall.

See also
Mountain peaks of Alaska

References

Alaska Range
Mountains of Matanuska-Susitna Borough, Alaska
Mountains of Denali National Park and Preserve
Mountains of Alaska